Sylvie Caster (born 1952 in Arcachon , Gironde) is a French journalist and writer.

Biography 
After studying journalism and political science in Bordeaux, Sylvie Caster published numerous columns, notably in Charlie Hebdo from 1976 to 1981 at the time of Cavanna, Wolinski and Reiser, then in Le Canard enchaîné.

She entered Le Canard in 1983 where she hosted a column entitled "Calamity Caster", where she took an energetic position in a whole series of social debates. She was the first woman writer of Le Canard enchaîné since 1920. The arrival of this strong personality did not go unnoticed to the newspaper which, by tradition, is accompanied in the texts and also the drawings, with a smiling but real misogyny . She received the Mumm Prize in 1994.

Since its creation in 2008, she regularly collaborates with the magazine XXI, in which she draws a unique portrait of France today.

She is the author, among others, of five novels including Les Chênes verts and Dormir.

Works 
1980: Les Chênes verts, Le Livre de Poche, 
1982: La France fout la camp, recueil de chroniques parues dans Charlie Hebdo, éd. Trévise-BFB
1985: Nel est mort, Le Livre de Poche, 
1991: Bel-Air, Éditions Grasset, Prix populiste et Prix des bouquinistes
1994: La bombe humaine, Arléa, 
1995: La Petite Sibérie, Grasset, 
2002: Dormir, Prix Jean-Freustié 2003.
2010: Ici-bas, coédition Les Arènes-XXI, 
2015: L'homme océan, Éditions du Seuil, series "Raconter la vie",

References

External links 
 Sylvie Caster on Babelio
 Sylvie Caster: Siné, c’est un modèle de môme éternel on Libération (5 May 2016)
 Sylvie Caster on Itinéraires
 Un mois chez Charlie-Hebdo

20th-century French writers
21st-century French writers
20th-century French journalists
21st-century French journalists
French women journalists
Charlie Hebdo people
Prix Jean Freustié winners
1952 births
People from Arcachon
Living people
20th-century French women
21st-century French women